The Chris Candido Memorial Show was an annual professional wrestling memorial event produced by the USA Xtreme Wrestling (UXW) promotion and held between 2005 and 2006. The show was held in memory of Chris Candido, who died from a blood clot due to complications from ankle surgery in Matawan, New Jersey on April 28, 2005, with the proceeds and merchandise sales being donated to Candido's late common-law wife and manager Tammy Lynn Sytch and the Chris Candido Scholarship Fund.

Events
Though not the first such event, the show was arguably the biggest gathering of former alumni of Extreme Championship Wrestling prior to the Hardcore Homecoming shows which started that same year. It was also the third major memorial show held for a former ECW star, the second and last one held by UXW, and one of four held for Chris Candido: the Chris Candido Memorial Tag Team Tournament (2005), the Chris Candido Cup Tag Team Tournament (2007-2008) and the Chris Candido Memorial J-Cup (2009). A second Candido Memorial Show was held by the National Wrestling Superstars, another independent promotion Candido wrestled for, during the same time. NWS promoter Joe Panzarino acquired the rights to promote the J-Cup Tournament that same year which was subsequently renamed the Chris Candido Memorial J-Cup.

The first show was later released on DVD by two companies, RF Video and TCTapes.net; Rob Feinstein and Doug Gentry both made public appearances for the event while RF Video provided additional coverage backstage and conducted interviews with wrestlers and other on-screen personalities in attendance including Candido's younger brother Johnny, The Sandman, Mick Foley, Raven, Balls Mahoney (who also performed as a color commentator), Axl Rotten, DeVito, Corporal Robinson, Stephen DeAngelis, Kid Kash, Trinity, Bill Apter and others discussing their memories of Candido. Sean "The Mic" McCaffery, editor-in-chief of DeclarationofIndependents.net, also provided color commentary for TCTapes.net. The show was also promoted on Don Tony's Wrestling Hotline internet radio show by offering those who ordered tickets via Anthony 'Don Tony' DeBlasi and Wrestling-News.com to have their photo be taken with Daffney and be the first fans let into the building before the general public.

While the promotion was praised for its tribute to Candido, who had been a mainstay in USA Xtreme Wrestling since 2001, the memorial shows themselves received mixed reviews from critics. Some of the criticism was due to the length of the shows, which ran roughly four hours, and the last-minute substitutions of local wrestlers in place of bigger stars. This was primarily due to promoter Frank Goodman dropping his policy prohibiting USA Pro wrestlers wrestling "double shots", in which wrestlers worked on more than one show a night, causing many of the bigger stars to arrive late or miss the show entirely. D-Lo Brown, for example, wrestled on two other shows on the night of the Candido's memorial. Several other promotions were running shows on the same night including the New York State Wrestling Federation (NYSWF) in Yonkers, New York, the CyberSpace Wrestling Federation (CSWF) in Wayne, New Jersey, and smaller organizations in Pennsylvania. This, in addition to the heavy inbound traffic to Long Island, resulted in more than half the regular roster being absent a half-hour before showtime. It also meant last-minute changes to the card, substituting opponents with local wrestlers or dropping other matches altogether, as Crowbar, "Lowlife" Louie Ramos, Mana the Polynesian Warrior, Billy Reil, Sonny Siaki, Sabu, and Xavier were all unable to make the show. Similarly, Axl Rotten, Sabu and Big Van Vader were scheduled to be on the second show but failed to appear as did UXW sound technician and referee Pat Savino, whose wife had gone into child labor earlier that night, meaning wrestlers were not provided with entrance music.

Among the reviews, GumGod.com's Matt Dawgs called the first event "one of the best UXW shows ever assembled" while Peter Kent of 411mania.com referred to the show as "torture" and gave the show a rating of 1 out of 5. In his review of the second event, John Lynch of DeclarationofIndependents.net wrote the event "seemingly marked the end of one era in UXW and the beginning of another" as many of the promotion's former ECW stars were likely to leave the promotion to join World Wrestling Entertainment's newly formed ECW brand.

Show results

First Annual Chris Candido Memorial Show (2005)
May 21, 2005 in Old Bethpage, New York (Skate Safe America)

Second Annual Chris Candido Memorial Show (2006)
May 20, 2006 in Old Bethpage, New York (Skate Safe America)

Notes

References

External links
Chris Candido Memorial Show at USAProWrestling.net

Professional wrestling memorial shows
2005 in professional wrestling
2006 in professional wrestling
Professional wrestling in New York (state)